Matal may refer to:

Matal language, Cameroon
Bohumír Matal, Czech painter
Matal v. Tam, a U.S. Supreme Court case